Chavapadu is a village near Amaravati in Guntur district of Andhra Pradesh. This village has historical significance with Vasireddy clan. Famous Telugu film actor M. Balaiah was born in this village.

References 

Villages in Guntur district